Dhandhaniya Sasan is a village in Balesar, Jodhpur district, Rajasthan, India.

References

Villages in Jodhpur district
Sasan